Nowinski is a surname. Notable people with the surname include:

 Christopher Nowinski (born 1978), American author and former professional wrestler
 Ira Nowinski (born 1942), American photographer

Surnames of Polish origin